Agapanthia violacea is a species of flat-faced longhorn beetle belonging to the family Cerambycidae, subfamily Lamiinae.

This beetle is present in most Europe and in the Near East. The different coloration between male and female demonstrates the great variability of colours.

They are polyphagous on herbaceous plants, mainly feeding on Medicago sativa, Onobrychis viciifolia, Centranthus ruber, as well as on Scabiosa, Echium, Psoralea, Valeriana and Salvia species.

References

External links
Cerambyx

violacea
Beetles of Europe
Beetles described in 1775
Taxa named by Johan Christian Fabricius